Frank Murphy (1916–1993) was an Irish architect. Born in Cork, he was active mainly in the 1950s and 1960s, and his works include a number of modernist structures. In a 2018 editorial in the Irish Examiner, Murphy was described as "arguably Cork's most eminent and exciting modern architect", and as "Cork's unsung hero of Modernism".

Life and career

Murphy was born in Cork, Ireland in 1916. He graduated from University College Dublin's School of Architecture in 1939, and the following year established an architectural practice in Cork city.

Murphy was influenced by both Scandinavian and American architecture, and his work featured complex surfaces as well as curtain wall facades. While the former is particularly present in his storefront designs, the latter international style is reflected in projects such as Thompson's Bakery and the Cork Distillers Company Bottling plant. Murphy's work include churches, factories, offices, housing and shopfronts, some of which employ varied and sometimes "eccentric" material palettes.

In 1956, Murphy designed West Cork's first modernist building, All saints Church in Drimoleague, and Cork city's first purpose-built office building 'Sutton House' in 1966. In 1968, Murphy was alarmed at the destruction and demolition of Cork City's built heritage and set up the Cork Preservation Society. In 1975, during the European Architectural Heritage Year, he was awarded the European Award for Architecture, the Europa Nostra Medal, by the Royal Institute of the Architects of Ireland for his restoration of Skiddy's Almshouse.

Works

 Jenning's Soda Water Factory, Cork City (1949)
 Belmont Hospital, Ferrybank, Waterford (1950)
 Ballyphehane Convent, Cork City (1955)
 Drimoleague Church, West Cork (1956)
 Mayne's Pharmacy, Pembroke Street, Cork City (1960)
 Cork Distiller's Bottling Plant, Cork City (1964)
 Sutton House, Cork City (1965)
 Dale House, Leytenstone, London (1965)
 Thompson's Bakery, MacCurtain Street, Cork City (1966)
 Skiddy's Almshouse Restoration, Shandon Cork City (1975)

Publications
Cork's Modern Architect: The Work of Frank Murphy (2019) by Conor English, published by the heritage council of Ireland and Cork City Council.

References

External links

 Archiseek.com entry - with descriptions of his buildings

1916 births
1993 deaths
People from Cork (city)
Alumni of University College Dublin
20th-century Irish architects